Abkhaz Ridge or Chkhalta Ridge (Apsnytvi ridge ; ,  Apkhazetiskedi  ) — mountain range in Abkhazia, on the southern slopes of Greater Caucasus. Ridge provides drainage divide between the Chkhalta River drainage basin and basins of the Amtkeli, Jambali, Kuabchari and Zimi rivers.

Geography 
The ridge serves as an eastern continuation of the Bzyb Range, from which it is separated by a low cofferdam pass Amtkel, in the area of which the river Kelasur begins, the valley of which separates southern spurs of two ridges. It stretches in accordance with the direction of folding parallel to the Main Caucasian (Dividing) ridge, from which it is separated by the upper reaches of the Bzyb River and the  valley Chkhalta River.

The length of the ridge is about 60 km, the height is up to 3026 m. Notable mountain peaks:  (3026 m),  (2638 m),  (2670 m), Zurgia (2295 m) and others. A ridge with sharp mountain glacial forms (traces of significant ancient glaciation), modern glaciation is insignificant: three cirque glaciers with a total area of no more than 1 km2. The gentle southern slopes are cut by deep canyon rivers Amtkel and Jampal, as well as their tributaries. In the middle part of the northern slope, there are several high-mountainous lakes belonging to the Chkhalta basin.

The mountains consist of porphyry from the Jura and mica schist. The slopes are covered with spruce - fir and beech oval forests, in the ridge part there are mountain meadows. Karst new phenomena are widespread: underground rivers, caves, wells.

See also 
Bzyb Range
Gagra Range

References 

Notes

Mountain ranges of Abkhazia
Mountain ranges of the Caucasus